Territorial Assembly elections were held in Guinea on 30 March 1952.

Electoral system
The 50-member General Council was elected by groups; the First College (French citizens) elected 18 members and the Second College elected 32 members.

Results

References

Guinea
1952 in Guinea
Elections in Guinea
Election and referendum articles with incomplete results
March 1952 events in Africa